Mirrabooka is a suburb on a peninsula east of the town of Morisset on the western side of Lake Macquarie in New South Wales, Australia. It is part of the West Ward of the City of Lake Macquarie local government area.

History 
The town's name, an Aboriginal word for either the Southern Cross,  or "dog died here", was formerly known as Mirraview. Early industries were timber cutting and fishing. A school operated from 1936 to 1972. The town fell into decline after 1970, but has since undergone a resurgence.

References

External links
 History of Mirrabooka (Lake Macquarie City Library)

Suburbs of Lake Macquarie